Sir Charles Hulse, 4th Baronet (12 October 1771 – 25 October 1854) was a British Member of Parliament.

He was the eldest surviving son of Sir Edward Hulse, 3rd Baronet of Breamore House, Breamore, Hampshire
and was educated at Eton College (1782-9) and Christ Church, Oxford (1790), after which he studied law at Lincoln's Inn. He succeeded his father to the baronetcy and to Breamore House on 30 September 1816.

He was MP for West Looe 11 March 1816 - 1826 and 6 April 1827 - 1832.

He married Maria, the daughter of John Buller of Morval, Cornwall; they had 5 sons and a daughter. He was succeeded by his son Edward, the 5th baronet.

References

1771 births
1854 deaths
People from New Forest District
People educated at Eton College
Alumni of Christ Church, Oxford
Members of Lincoln's Inn
Baronets in the Baronetage of Great Britain
Members of the Parliament of the United Kingdom for West Looe
UK MPs 1812–1818
UK MPs 1818–1820
UK MPs 1820–1826
UK MPs 1826–1830
UK MPs 1830–1831
UK MPs 1831–1832
English barristers